WBZX (103.9 FM) is a radio station in Big Rapids, Michigan. Owned by Up North Radio, LLC, the station broadcasts a classic hits format branded as B103.9.

The station first broadcast on August 24, 2016, stunting with a beautiful music format as "Beautiful 104" until its official launch on August 27, 2016. The station is owned by Up North Radio, who also owns and operates WCKC, Cadillac, and WCDY, McBain-Cadillac.

References

External links

BZX
Classic hits radio stations in the United States
Radio stations established in 2017
2017 establishments in Michigan